"Viva la Quinta Brigada" (listed as "Viva la Quince Brigada" in later recordings) is a Christy Moore song about the Irishmen who fought in the Spanish Civil War against Franco. The title was inspired by a Spanish song about the war, Ay Carmela, of which "Viva la Quinta Brigada" are the opening lyrics.

Moore wrote this song choosing to focus on the Irish socialist volunteers (who in later years became known as the Connolly Column) who were a small contingent within the 15th International Brigade.  The tune which he used was substantially similar to the version of Viva la Quince Brigada recorded by Pete Seeger and the Almanac Singers in the early 1940s.

The song was inspired by Spanish Civil War veteran Michael O'Riordan's 1979 book Connolly Column.

Moore said: "Without Michael O'Riordan I'd never have been able to write Viva la Quince Brigada. I must have performed the song over a thousand times and every single time I sing it I think of Mick and wonder how can I ever thank him enough. In Spain in 1983 I was reading his book, Connolly Column – the story of the Irishmen who fought for the Spanish Republic, and I began this song as I read on. The song was lifted entirely from his book.

Moore's original song title - which translates as "Long live the Fifth Brigade" - was a slip due to the similarity in Spanish between "quinta" (fifth) and "quince" (fifteen). The bulk of Irish volunteers served with the XV (Fifteen) International Brigade; the "Fifth Brigade" was not one of the International Brigades. The song later appeared listed as Viva la Quince Brigada as Moore corrected the mistake in subsequent recordings.
Both titles are correct however, originally there were ten brigades in the  Spanish army, the five international brigades were then added to the list making the 5th International Brigade the 15th Brigade of the Spanish republic.

See also
Irish Socialist Volunteers in the Spanish Civil War
Connolly Column
Michael O'Riordan
¡Ay Carmela!, different Spanish Civil War song sometimes known as "Viva la Quinta Brigada"

References

External links
 Lyrics and tabs at the author's site

Protest songs
Songs based on actual events
Songs about Spain
Songs about Ireland
Spanish Civil War in popular culture
Songs written by Christy Moore
Year of song missing